Trinidad is the home rule municipality that is the county seat and the most populous municipality of Las Animas County, Colorado, United States. The population was 8,329 as of the 2020 census. It is on the historic Santa Fe Trail.

History

Early
Trinidad was first explored by Spanish and Mexican traders, who liked its proximity to the Santa Fe Trail. It was founded in 1862 soon after coal was discovered in the region. This led to an influx of immigrants eager to capitalize on this natural resource. By the late 1860s, the town had about 1,200 residents. Trinidad was officially incorporated in 1876, just a few months before Colorado became a state. In 1878 the Atchison, Topeka and Santa Fe Railway reached Trinidad, making it easier for goods to be shipped from distant locations. In the 1880s Trinidad became home to a number of well-known people, including Bat Masterson, who briefly served as the town's marshal in 1882. By 1900 Trinidad's population had grown to 7,500 and it had two English-language newspapers and one in Spanish. In 1885, Holy Trinity Catholic Church was constructed.

In the early 1900s Trinidad became nationally known for having the first woman sports editor of a newspaper, Ina Eloise Young. Her expertise was in baseball, and in 1908 she was the only woman sportswriter to cover the World Series. During the same time, Trinidad was home to a popular semiprofessional baseball team that was briefly coached by Damon Runyon.   
On August 7, 1902, the Bowen Town coal mine, six miles north of Trinidad, experienced a horrific gas explosion, killing 13 miners. It was one of the worst mining disasters so far in the state; conditions in the mine provided the impetus for several labor strikes. At one point in late 1903, an estimated 3,000 miners, members of the United Mine Workers of America, went on strike. In 1904 Trinidad experienced several disasters. In mid-January a fire destroyed two blocks of the town's business section, causing more than $75,000 in damages. In late September, the Trinidad area and the region along the Purgatoire River endured an unusually heavy rainstorm, leading to severe flooding; the flood destroyed the Santa Fe railroad station, wiped out every bridge in town, and caused several hundred thousand dollars' worth of property damage. As Trinidad continued to grow, a number of new construction projects began in the downtown area, including a new library, a new city hall, an opera house, and a new hotel.

1913-1914 Strike

Trinidad became the a focal point of the 1913-1914 United Mine Workers of America strike against the Rockefeller-owned Colorado Fuel & Iron company, which has come to be known as the Colorado Coalfield War. The Colorado and Southern Railway stop that connected Trinidad with Denver and Walsenburg made the town strategically important for both the strikers and Colorado National Guard. On April 20, 1914, just 18 miles north of town, the events of the Ludlow Massacre occurred.

Recent
Trinidad was dubbed the "Sex Change Capital of the World", because a local doctor had an international reputation for performing sex reassignment surgery. In the 1960s, Stanley Biber, a veteran surgeon returning from Korea, decided to move to Trinidad because he had heard that the town needed a surgeon. In 1969 a local social worker asked him to perform the surgery for her, which he learned by consulting diagrams and a New York surgeon. Biber attained a reputation as a good surgeon at a time when very few doctors were performing sex-change operations. At his peak he averaged four sex-change operations a day, and the term "taking a trip to Trinidad" became a euphemism for some seeking the procedures he offered. Biber was featured in an episode of South Park, in which elementary school teacher Mr. Garrison undergoes a sex-change operation. Biber's surgical practice was taken over in 2003 by Marci Bowers. Bowers has since moved the practice to Burlingame, California. The 2008 documentary Trinidad focuses on Bowers and two of her patients.

Founded by art students and filmmakers from the University of Kansas and University of Colorado at Boulder, Drop City became known as the first rural "hippie commune", and received attention from Life and Time magazines, as well as from reporters around the world. Drop City was abandoned by the early 1970s, but influenced subsequent alternative-living projects across the country.

In 2015 Trinidad started to experience a new boom due to the marijuana industry. The town raised $4.4 million in tax revenue from $44 million in annual marijuana sales, about 5.13% of the state's total sales. In 2018 High Times called Trinidad "Weed Town, USA", noting that its 23 licensed retail marijuana dispensaries serving less than 10,000 people amounts to one dispensary per 352 people. "In one downtown block alone along Commercial Street, there are eight dispensaries in a section of town some locals jokingly refer to as the Trinidad 'weed mall'."

Geography
Trinidad is located at  (37.170944, −104.506447).

The city lies 13 mi north of the New Mexico border. On the northern end of the town is Simpson's Rest, a prominent bluff named for early resident George Simpson, who is buried atop it. North Avenue leads to a rut-prone county road to the top of Simpson's Rest for overviews of the city. To the northwest are the prominent Spanish Peaks.

Climate
Trinidad experiences a semiarid climate, with hot summers and cold winters. Summer days are hot, but due to Trinidad's high elevation summer nights are cool, and temperatures drop sharply after sunset. Winters are cold, but milder than in many mountain towns in Colorado. In the winter, daytime highs are usually above freezing, but temperatures below  are possible, especially at night.

Demographics

As of the census of 2000, 9,078 people, 3,701 households, and 2,335 families resided in the city. The 4,126 housing units averaged 654.2 per square mile (252.5/km). The racial makeup of the city was 79.97% White, 0.54% African American, 3.02% Native American, 0.43% Asian, 0.14% Pacific Islander, 12.12% from other races, and 3.78% from two or more races. Hispanics or Latinos of any race were 48.07% of the population.

Of the 3,701 households, 29.5% had children under the age of 18 living with them, 43.6% were married couples living together, 14.5% had a female householder with no husband present, and 36.9% were not families; 32.7% of all households were made up of individuals, and 16.2% had someone living alone who was 65 years of age or older. The average household size was 2.36 and the average family size was 2.98.

In the city, the population was distributed as 24.9% under the age of 18, 9.4% from 18 to 24, 24.2% from 25 to 44, 22.6% from 45 to 64, and 18.9% who were 65 years of age or older. The median age was 39 years. For every 100 females, there were 92.5 males. For every 100 females age 18 and over, there were 89.8 males.

The median income for a household in the city was $36,681, and for a family was $33,992. Males had a median income of $27,817 versus $19,064 for females. The per capita income for the city was $17,271. About 16.2% of families and 18.3% of the population were below the poverty line, including 19.6% of those under age 18 and 20.0% of those age 65 or over.

Economy

For many years Trinidad housed the miners who worked in the coal mines of the Raton Basin south and west of the town. Major operators included Colorado Fuel and Iron and Victor-American Fuel Company. The mines are now closed, but since the 1980s companies have been drilling new gas wells to extract coalbed methane from the remaining coal seams.

Trinidad's location at the foot of Raton Pass, along the Santa Fe Trail between St. Joseph, Missouri, and Santa Fe, New Mexico, has always made it a favored route for travelers, first by foot, then horse and ox-drawn wagon, then railroad. Interstate 25 is the most highly traveled route between Colorado and New Mexico and bisects Trinidad.

In the early 20th century Trinidad was the closest town to what many consider the beginning of the labor movement. Later that century the town saw swings of boom and bust as the oil industry heated and cooled.

Transportation

Road
 I-25
 US 160

Rail
Trinidad (Amtrak station), served by the Southwest Chief
Junction of BNSF Railway's Raton Subdivision, Twin Peaks Subdivision, and Spanish Peaks Subdivision

Air
Perry Stokes Airport

Bus
South Central Council of Governments operates demand-responsive transport in Trinidad.
Greyhound Lines serves Trinidad on its route between Denver and Albuquerque.
Limousine Express serves Trinidad on its route between Denver and El Paso.

Education
Trinidad State College

Sports
The Trinidad Triggers are a professional baseball team in the independent Pecos League which is not affiliated with Major League Baseball or Minor League Baseball.  They play their home games at Trinidad Central Park.

Notable people

 Buster Adams, major league outfielder
 Felipe Baca, early settler
 Casimiro Barela, State Senator, known for his role in the publication of the Colorado State Constitution and his 40 years long tenure in the Colorado State Senate. Also served as Justice of Peace in Trinidad.
 Stanley Biber, physician
 Marci Bowers, physician
 Dana B. Chase (1848–1897), photographer
 John Gagliardi, a native, coached football while attending high school in Trinidad and playing on the squad – NCAA all-time, all-division winningest football coach.
 Erick Hawkins, modern-dance choreographer and dancer, was born in Trinidad.
 Snatam Kaur, singer of Sikh religious music, was born in Trinidad.
 Cissy King, dancer of The Lawrence Welk Show, was born in Trinidad.
 Ronnie Lane, rock musician, lived in Trinidad during final years of his life.
 Bat Masterson, Old West gunman, was town marshal of Trinidad during the 1880s. His brother Jim was also town marshal during the 1880s.
 M. Mike Miller, travel writer and eight-term member of the Alaska House of Representatives, was born in Trinidad.
 Arthur Roy Mitchell, Western artist, was a Trinidad native; the Mitchell Museum houses many of his major works.
 Erskine Sanford, actor, was most notable for his work with Orson Welles in films such as Citizen Kane.
 Bernard J. Sullivan, Roman Catholic bishop, was born in Trinidad in 1889.
 Alice Ivers Tubbs, frontier gambler known as "Poker Alice"
 Thomas Wilson, composer, was born in Trinidad in 1927, lived there 17 months before moving to Glasgow.
 Ed Wolff, actor and circus giant
 Ina Eloise Young, first woman sports editor

See also

Las Animas County, Colorado
National Old Trails Road
Raton Pass
Santa Fe National Historic Trail
Spanish Peaks

References

External links

City of Trinidad
CDOT map of Trinidad
Visit Trinidad Colorado

 
Cities in Las Animas County, Colorado
Cities in Colorado
Municipalities in Colorado
Towns in Las Animas County, Colorado
Towns in Colorado
County seats in Colorado
Populated places established in 1862
1879 establishments in Colorado